Moio de' Calvi is a comune (municipality) in the Province of Bergamo in the Italian region of Lombardy, located about  northeast of Milan and about  north of Bergamo.  
 
Moio de' Calvi borders the following municipalities: Isola di Fondra, Lenna, Piazzatorre, Piazzolo, Roncobello, Valnegra.

References